Woo is an experimental music duo from the UK. The band consists of brothers Mark (born in 1953) and Clive Ives (born in 1956). They grew up in the South of London.

The band combine several musical styles, creating its own sound: Folk, Jazz, Pop, Ambient, Psychedelic as well as Healing Music. Woo is one of the first bands to incorporate acoustic instruments (clarinet, saxophone, Acoustic guitars, 12-string and bass guitars) into electronic music in the early 70's.

The name of the band, Woo, refers to the sound of a musical saw,an instrument the brother's uncle Fred used to play.

Biography

Early life (1965-1974)
The Ives brothers grow up in the South of London in Raynes Park before moving to Banstead. Their interest in music starts with seeing The Beatles on TV in the 60's. The Ives brothers founded their first band, The Tescades, at ages 6 and 9, with two childhood friends. Mark was on the guitar and Clive played an old drum kit belonging to his grandfather. The Tescades put on gigs in the garage of their house, and invited their friends to be the audience.

Their grandfather, a drummer in the Royal Marines, and their uncle Ivor, a Jazz musician, played an instrumental role in the musical development of the Ives brothers. Mark played at several Modern Jazz and Dixieland Jazz gigs with his uncle Ivor. The latter also gave Mark his first clarinet at the age of 15.

Mark started to learn to play the guitar and to write songs at the age of 13. During these early years, the Ives brothers rehearsed Mark’s new compositions. Clive was impressed by the talent of his older brother and tried to back him up with variety of creative tools. He used any available kitchen utensils as percussion instruments.

At 17, Mark joined a Royal Air Force band, and played clarinet. Meanwhile, Clive began to study art.

The two brothers started recording when Mark left the RAF.

First recordings and first album (1974-1982)
In 1974, the Ives brothers bought their first synthesizer, the SH-3A by Roland, and a Teac 4-track tape recorder. The duo started to explore composing and home-studio recording. The Ives brothers met several nights a week in a small flat and recorded throughout the night. Clive was on synthesizer and percussions, Mark was on bass guitar, 12-string guitar, saxophone and clarinet. The material of the first recordings are based mainly on Mark's ideas and compositions.

Mark dictated notes and chords to Clive and the band left the recorder on, hence comments from each other and background noises became part of the songs. As they recorded at night, they had to keep the volume down in order not to disturb the neighbours who banged on the walls as a means of complaint. This impacted the sound of the band: they were forced to record very quiet tracks with soft sounds. Triangles were used instead of drums, guitars were played in picking mode and keyboards were played in a delicate way.

In 1976, the band acquired a new synthesizer, the Roland system 100. It featured a sequencer that propelled the sound of the band to another dimension. Clive realized that the audio signal of Mark's acoustic instruments could be delivered directly to the synthesizer and its sequencer. He manipulated Mark’s playing with the help of oscillators and processors integrated in the synthesizer. Experimenting with this new technology offered the Ives brothers a completely new and innovative way to record their music.

"After our initial thrill of the wonders of recording we began to realize that with this technology at our fingertips, we could create beauty. Organic, unpredictable, mysterious things would happen when we allowed the technology to be set free, especially when Mark’s instruments were being treated through the sequencers and synths. Sometimes 1 and 1 made 3, and we were in creative heaven. From there the mind enters into the equation, and starts to envisage endless sounds upon sounds, combining musical influences and making them into something new …”

Clive Ives on the new approach of recording by the band. Woo tried to translate their different emotional states spontaneously and composes pieces that could evoke dream-like atmospheres, for example - Parisian cafés, Russian music and imaginary landscapes . This gave the music of the band a rich diversity of styles and sounds. With a brand new creative impulse, Woo kept creating endlessly, and recorded hundreds of tunes over a period of five years. In 1981, an old school friend of Clive, who had become an artist manager, submitted the music of the band to Mike Alway at Cherry Red Records. Mike decided to help them release an album. The band then chose several tracks for its first album from the previous five years recordings, and it was released under Woo’s Sunshine Series label.

In 1982, during the new wave and punk era, Woo released their first album, Whichever Way You Are Going You Are Going Wrong, with 10 instrumental tracks and one song sung by Mark. It was mixed by Clive, who also designed the LP cover.

The album was well received by the English musical press, in particular Melody Maker and NME, which described the music of the Ives brothers as a collaboration between the Durutti Column and Penguin Cafe Orchestra, produced by Brian Eno.

During that time, Woo met the bands Everything but the Girl and Five or Six. They became friends and shared jam sessions.

Next three albums (1982-1991)
Free and under no contract, the band kept building its musical career, recording more and more tracks, in a free creative spirit, for a total of 1500 tracks over a period of 10 years. The Ives brothers become strongly interested in Raja Yoga and spiritual healing. Mark studied theosophy and Krishna consciousness, while Clive started practicing Shiatsu in parallel with their musical creations. Their spiritual interests had a strong impact on Woo's forthcoming musical projects.

In 1987, the US label Independent Projects Records re-released Whichever Way You Are Going You Are Going Wrong. In 1989, It's Cosy Inside, which Woo had already created in 1983, was released in the US as well as in Europe, and gave the band the opportunity to get some exposure on the other side of the Atlantic.

The band's musical style had evolved and was more mature throughout the 16 tracks of the album. This new album is influenced for the most part by George Orwell's novel "1984".

"When we were recording, 1982-1983 we were living the suburban post-apocalyptic vision. The track “BB…..!” refers to the chant for Big Brother in 1984. CCT cameras had just been erected around the corner from where we were living and it felt like Big Brother was on his way! I photographed them and collaged them onto the top right corner of the album cover. The song “The Final Card”—also symbolised by the bar codes on the computer screen on the album cover—is a reference to identity tagging, where all our identity and finances are kept in an implanted under your skin. With Orwell’s vision looming towards us, the fear of nuclear war, conspiracy theories of the Illuminati, the apparent demise of the Love Generation—and with that loss, the reaction to the increasing awareness of all that is wrong in the world manifesting in suburban London with anarchy and Punk—and the increasing gulf between rich and poor with the Thatcher Government … Yeah, we were buying into an apocalyptic vision. "

- Clive Ives on the inspiration for the album "It's Cosy Inside"

Unfortunately, "It's Cosy Inside" did not have the same commercial success as the debut album, leading to a declining popularity of the band.

1990s
Woo left its US label, and signed its next album with the label Cloud 9 Music. The third Woo album was issued in 1990 (on cassette only). Called "Into The Heart Of Love", it is often regarded as the band's masterpiece. This album had a new alchemy. Throughout the 20 slow-tempo tracks, which are sometimes accompanied by lyrics but for the most part instrumental, Mark's guitar and clarinet, as well as Clive's keyboard layers, shine in an oneiric mood. Influences for this album are very diverse: Native American mythologies, extra-terrestrial life, Tibetan culture, Steven Spielberg's movie 'Close Encounters of the Third Kind' and above all, universal love. Some tracks featured on the album were composed in the 70's.
In 1991, the band issues their third album in 3 years "A La Luna" on Grunki Records. This album, featuring 26 tracks, is very atmospheric and once again with a broad range of influences, and titles including Nazca Lines, Man on the Moon, Voices in the Night and Orbit Unknown.

Through these years, Woo played very rarely on stage. The band reckons its true strength lies in the way they work in the studio, and that its intimate music comes from an alchemy between the two members that does not translate into live performances. Mark often plays on his own with his guitar during various gigs, mainly at festivals and in pubs.

The band developed aesthetics of its own throughout the 1980s, and started the 1990s with more maturity and more evolved technical skills.

In 1995, the band published a new album with 7 tracks, "Live from Venus", produced by Dave Goodman, sound engineer of the Sex Pistols. Mark and his girlfriend Ruby created the title for this album, linking New Age symbolism with the planet Venus. Clive used a Notron sequencer, which Bjork famously used. From a musical standpoint, the band's style leaned more towards Sci-Fi- inspired trance, dance and ambient. On some tracks Woo also used old vocal recordings of people who reported to have met Venusians.

Also in 1995, Woo issued Forever Healing, the band's first foray into the world of "healing music". Clive used this music during his Shiatsu sessions. The album contains 12 tracks for relaxation and meditation.

The band kept recording regularly throughout the '90s; Mark recorded several albums of songs, while Clive kept recording albums of music for meditation sessions. Since 1995's Forever Healing, the duo did not release an album until the 2010s.

2010s
In the early 2010s, several labels approached the band to get their old albums re-issued. The second album was the first to be re-issued: It's Cosy Inside was published in 2012 by Drag City and Yoga Records. Following the critical success of this re-issue, the band was contacted by the English label Emotional Rescue for a more comprehensive re-issue of its back catalogue. In 2013, Whichever Way You Are Going You Are Going Wrong, Woo's first album, was issued again. Due to the growing popularity, the band decided to publish a new album. For this purpose archives from 1974 to 1990 were unearthed. When the Past Arrives, the new album featuring 14 tracks, was released on Drag City Records in 2014. It was an instant success. The album received very positive feedback from the musical press, even scoring 7.7 out of 10 on Pitchfork. This album allowed a new audience to discover the musical essence of the band.

The very same year, Woo was commissioned by the English Touring Opera to compose an opera for children, named "Waxwings". The work was created for the annual ETO tour that included the UK and Luxembourg in 2015. In 2014, Into the Heart of Love was the next album to be reissued, highlighting the growing popularity of the duo even more.
In 2016, Woo released a new album with tracks from its archives that was published by Palto Flats Records. AWAAWAA, comprising 22 tracks, was both a critical and commercial success. Emotional Rescue re-issued A La Luna in 2017.

Since 2016, Woo have continued to release new albums on their Bandcamp page, including All Is Well which came out as an LP in 2019,  released by Slowboy Records, and contained 13 tracks, combining both instrumental titles and songs.

The band continues to work on new projects, new original albums and re-workings of their archives.

In June 2020, Woo released a new album, Arcturian Corridor on Quindi Records.

Influences
The bands cites as main influences: Claude Debussy, Erik Satie, Yes, Todd Rundgren, The Beatles, Stevie Wonder, David Bowie, Brian Eno, Frank Zappa, Sergei Prokofiev, Stan Getz and Lionel Hampton.

Members
Mark Ives : Guitar, clarinet, bass guitar, vocals, composition
Clive Ives : Synthesiser, percussion, keyboard programming, composition

Discography
 1982: Whichever You Are Going You Are Going Wrong
 1989: It's Cosy Inside
 1990: Into The Heart Of Love
 1991: A La Luna
 1995: Live From Venus
 1995: Forever Healing
 2012: When The Past Arrives
 2013: Christmas Presence
 2014: Please Remember To Breathe w/ Ruby
 2014: Light Of The World w/ Ruby
 2015: Waxwings w/ The English Touring Opera
 2015: Ruby's Pastlives
 2015: Planning For A Miracle
 2015: Ayla's Legacy w/ Freida Mai
 2015: Starlight
 2016: AWAAWAA
 2016: Dobbin's Lost His Coconuts
 2016: ROBOT X
 2016: Woo Romantics
 2016: How to Make Your Home Look Like Space
 2017: When My Loves Goes Away
 2017: A Dream
 2017: Xylophonics
 2018: Another Place Another Time
 2018: Covers
 2019: All Is Well
 2020: Arcturian Corridor
 2021: Play The Blues
 2022: Paradise In Pimlico

References

Musical groups from London
Sibling musical duos
Male musical duos
British experimental musical groups
British ambient music groups
English electronic music duos